Constantine Harbor is an inlet on the eastern end of the north coast of the island of Amchitka in the Aleutian Islands in Alaska. It is near the site of an abandoned military airstrip.

Notes

References
Merriam-Webster's Geographical Dictionary, Third Edition. Springfield, Massachusetts: Merriam-Webster, Incorporated, 1997. .

Rat Islands
Inlets of Alaska
Bodies of water of Aleutians West Census Area, Alaska